Vira Bahu II was King of Gampola who ruled from 1391/2 to 1397. He succeeded Bhuvanaikabahu V and was succeeded by Vira Alakesvara. He may have been succeeded two of his sons in the year 1397.

See also
 List of Sri Lankan monarchs
 History of Sri Lanka

References

External links
 Kings & Rulers of Sri Lanka
 Codrington's Short History of Ceylon

Monarchs of Gampola
House of Siri Sanga Bo
V
V